To The American Indian is a 1916 novel by Native American author and Yurok Woman Lucy Thompson. The novel received an award from the American Book Award in 1992 long after her passing in 1932. The novel was written with an intention to preserve and remember her peoples stories. To the American Indian has a total 32 chapters and the chapter are stories about the Yurok people. In To the American Indian,  the readers can find a combination of Native language and the English language, this combinations of languages may confuse the reader.

Ceremonies and Tradition 

The making of a Yurok woman doctor happens in a way very unique and elaborate, The majority of them are rather young and under families of wealth. But the tradition that comes along with becoming a woman doctor involves teaching one to smoke and being commenced at the sweat house. Wearing traditional, heavy clothes and with a bare chest, the young woman enters the sweat house and joins in song, smoking, dancing, until she is exhausted and the special meal can commence. There is a lot that goes into the graduation of becoming a young doctor, and this is a ceremonial event that lasts years and is full of traditional exercises and challenges of the mind and body.

Yurok "Slavery" (Yurok Ki-elth) 
In the book the word "SLAVE or SLAVERY" shows up about 29 times, and also it pops out as the title of one chapter, but, when the reader  hears or thinks about the word "slave", the reader will immediately think of the history, when the White people used to have African people (black people) as workers with a bad life condition, but Mrs Lucy Thompson does not describe it like that. “The natives of Yurok went to the dwellings of the whites, to ask for a home for their native families, and they were welcomed and treated like their own family by white people." Thompson states  "Slavery was brought about by wars, famines, and contagious diseases." Thompson says in such times "They [poor families]  would go to some rich man's house and offer themselves as slaves, and these offers were usually accepted." In Thompson's Yurok culture, "Slavery" is defined as Native American Indian people who go to white people houses and ask them for a house, also the white people give them work and a good lifestyle without any violence.

Tobacco 

Tobacco plays an important role in tradition and ceremonies in the Yurok Tribe, the harvesting is frugal and particular and despite how much they smoke, they never let themselves be taken a hold of by the tight grasp a tobacco habit brings. Women are rarely ever to smoke, but they take part in the packing of pipes and farming go the plants, whereas women doctors take from the pipe daily and before bed, such as the men of the tribe. There are particular ways of cultivation it, holding It, and smoking it that the Yurok Tribe are sensitive and ceremonious about each day and night.

Reception 

In a 1991 forward to the novel, Peter E. Palmquist wrote that he was unsure about To The American Indian and neglected it a multitude of times before comprehending how important the story was, and delving into it fully. He was a professional photographer who worked and honed his skills for over 50 years and in seen as an important figure in photography and the documentation of indigenous history, He notes that his job was to listen to the hard and fascinating truth of the culture Lucy Thompson was dedicated on telling.

Awards 
In the year 1992 "To the American Indian" won the "American Book Awards"

References 

1916 novels
Native American novels